Lindsay Davenport and Martina Hingis successfully defended their title, defeating Jana Novotná and Barbara Schett in the final, 6–2, 6–2 to win the ladies' invitation doubles tennis title at the 2013 Wimbledon Championships.

Draw

Final

Group A
Standings are determined by: 1. number of wins; 2. number of matches; 3. in two-players-ties, head-to-head records; 4. in three-players-ties, percentage of sets won, or of games won; 5. steering-committee decision.

Group B
Standings are determined by: 1. number of wins; 2. number of matches; 3. in two-players-ties, head-to-head records; 4. in three-players-ties, percentage of sets won, or of games won; 5. steering-committee decision.

References
 Draw

Women's Invitation Doubles